Antašava Manor is a former residential manor in Antašava, Kupiškis district.

References

Manor houses in Lithuania
Classicism architecture in Lithuania